The  was an infantry division of the Imperial Japanese Army. Its call sign was the 

The 44th division was organized on 4 April 1944, simultaneously with the 81st and 86th divisions as a defiant action against popular Japanese Tetraphobia superstition. The nucleus was the headquarters of the 4th division. Originally the 44th division was assigned to Central District Army.

In March 1945, the 44th division was sent to Takahagi, Ibaraki, arriving 8 April 1945. The division was re-subordinated to 51st army 18 April 1945 and assigned to the role of the mobile reserve. The surrender of Japan 15 August 1945 has happened before the 44th division have any engagement with the enemy.

Notes

References

Japanese World War II divisions
Military units and formations established in 1944
Military units and formations disestablished in 1945
Infantry divisions of Japan
1944 establishments in Japan
1945 disestablishments in Japan